R. M. Veerappan (also referred to as RMV or Rama Veerappan) is an Indian politician, an early Dravidian Leader, and a movie producer and screenwriter from the Indian state of Tamil Nadu. He is the founder and leader of the MGR Kazhagam party. He served as a Cabinet Minister in five governments from 1977 to 1996, is a three-time Member of Legislative Council and a two-time member of the Legislative Assembly. He was the Leader of the House for Legislative Assembly and Leader of ADMK party of the Legislative Council. He was the architect behind the ADMK organization, unified the MGR fan clubs for the party formation. He was called as the 'Chanakya' of AIADMK politics in the 70's and 80's.

Political and entertainment career 

RMV was introduced to Periyar in Karaikudi by Rama Subbaiah. He soon began to follow his Dravidian ideologies. He moved to Erode with Periyar and was there with him for some time. He met many other Dravidian leaders. He subsequently joined K R Ramaswamy's Krishnan Drama Company as supervisor. During this period, he became an admirer of Arignar Anna and also friends with Chevalier Sivaji Ganesan. The company was closed in 1950 and R. M. V. went to Madras.

In 1953 he met MGR through the advice of his mentor C N Annadurai and joined his drama company as Manager, later becoming an executive director of the Company Em.Gee.Yar Pictures. Nadodi Mannan was the first film under this banner which was released on 22 August 1958. The company later filmed Adimai Penn and Ulagam sutrum Valiban.

RMV later started his own production house and the banner's debut movie titled "Deiva Thai," with MGR in the lead role, was released in 1964. Director K Balachander made his debut into the Tamil film industry by writing the dialogues for this movie. Following that, MGR and RMV appeared together in many movies under this banner, such as Naan Anayittal, Kaavalkaran, Kannan En Kadhalan and Idhaya Kani. Rickshawkaran, produced by Sathya Movies, helped MGR achieve the National award for his performance.  In addition to this, the production house made films including Kadhal Parisu, Kakki Chattai, Ranuva Veeran, Moondru Mugam, Thanga Magan, Oor Kavalan, Panakaran, Baasha, Mandhira Punnagai, and Puthiya Vaanam. Among his movies, Basha, was remarkable and set box office records in all major South Indian languages.

RMV was using the super star status of MGR to propagate the DMK ideologies in his films and Rickshawkaran was a prime example where the movie was used to propagate Arignar Anna's DMK ideology during 1971 elections. When MGR moved out of the DMK following differences with M. Karunanidhi in 1972, RMV organised the fan clubs and helped him in starting the AIADMK party. In 1984, while MGR was ill, K. RMV, oversaw the party proceedings and election campaigning. Following the death of MGR in 1987, the party broke up into two factions where the larger faction was headed by him. He garnered support of 98 MLA's to instill V.N. Janaki as the Chief Minister  and then later reconciled with J. Jayalalithaa's faction and was the Joint General Secretary of the party.

He has been elected to the legislative assembly two times and to the legislative council three times. He was elected to the Tamil Nadu legislative assembly in the Tirunelveli constituency as an Anna Dravida Munnetra Kazhagam candidate in the Tamil Nadu state assembly bye-election in 1986 and in the Kangayam constituency of Tamil Nadu state assembly bye-election in 1991[2].

MGR Kazhagam 
MGR Kazhagam (MGR Federation), a political party in the Indian state of Tamil Nadu. The president of MGR Kazhagam is R. M. Veerappan, a former All India Anna Dravida Munnetra Kazhagam (AIADMK) founder and leader of the House.

MGR Kazhagam supported the Dravida Munnetra Kazhagam (DMK)-led Democratic Progressive Alliance in the 2004 Lok Sabha elections.

Literary and social service activities 

He is the founder and President of Kamban Kazhagam and Azhvargal Aaiyvu Maiyam. He also runs an education trust which funds the education of the oppressed.

Family life 

R.M.V married Thirumathi Rajammal on 12 March 1956, in Thiruparangundram. The wedding was conducted in the Tamil tradition under Arignar Anna. They have 3 daughters and 3 sons. The eldest daughter, Thirumathi Selvi, married T. G. Thyagarajan of Sathya Jyothi Films, son of Thiru. Venus Govindarajan of Venus Pictures.

Filmography

References 

Tamil Nadu politicians
Tamil Nadu ministers
All India Anna Dravida Munnetra Kazhagam politicians
Living people
1926 births
Tamil film producers
Film producers from Tamil Nadu
People from Pudukkottai district
Tamil screenwriters
20th-century Indian politicians
20th-century Indian dramatists and playwrights
Screenwriters from Tamil Nadu